Stephanus Cornelis Weijers  (13 November 1929 – 27 May 2021) was a Dutch politician who served as a member of the House of Representatives.

References

1929 births
2021 deaths
Dutch Roman Catholics
Dutch politicians
Members of the House of Representatives (Netherlands)
Catholic People's Party politicians
Christian Democratic Appeal politicians
People from Hillegom